Harlan Edward Wilson (February 3, 1914 – August 3, 1988) was an American professional basketball player. He played for the Indianapolis Kautskys in the National Basketball League and averaged 6.5 points per game.

References

1914 births
1988 deaths
American men's basketball players
Basketball players from Indiana
Canterbury Knights basketball players
Guards (basketball)
Indianapolis Kautskys players
Sportspeople from Lafayette, Indiana